Napiwoda  is a village in the administrative district of Gmina Nidzica, within Nidzica County, Warmian-Masurian Voivodeship, in northern Poland.

The village has a population of 792.

Notable residents
 Adolf Weitkunat (1895–1988), Wehrmacht general

References

Napiwoda